Kerek is an extinct language of Russia of the northern branch of the Chukotko-Kamchatkan languages. On historical linguistic grounds it is most closely related to Koryak (both languages have a merger of the proto-Chuktotian phonemes /*ð/ and /*r/ with /*j/). The next closest relative is Chukchi (/*ð/ and /*r/ are merged, but not /*j/).

In 1997 there were still two speakers remaining, but by 2005 the language was considered extinct. According to the 2010 census, there were 10 people claiming Kerek as their native language, a number which may include partial speakers and non-speakers who claim the language as part of their ethnic heritage. Over the 20th century many members of the Kerek ethnic group shifted to Chukchi, the language of the majority ethnic group in the area, but now most Chukchis and Kereks speak Russian.

Kerek is an agglutinative language, meaning that the morphemes build on each other to have different meanings.

References

External links
Bibliography

Agglutinative languages
Chukotko-Kamchatkan languages
Languages of Russia
Extinct languages of Asia